Geoffrey Haydn Moses (born 24 September 1952) is a Welsh classical singer and former first-class cricketer.

Moses was born in September 1952 at Mountain Ash, Glamorgan. He was educated at Ystalyfera Grammar School, before going up to read history at Emmanuel College, Cambridge. While studying at Cambridge, he played first-class cricket for Cambridge University Cricket Club in 1974, making three appearances. He had one match of note, taking a five wicket haul in The University Match against Oxford University at Lord's. In his three matches, he took a total of 9 wickets with his right-arm fast-medium bowling. He also made a single List A one-day appearance for Cambridge in the 1974 Benson & Hedges Cup against Sussex at Hove, taking the wickets of Geoff Greenidge and Mark Faber for the cost of 49 runs from 11 overs, with Sussex winning the match by 186 runs.

After graduating from Cambridge, he taught at Charterhouse School. He subsequently trained to become an operatic baritone singer at the Guildhall School of Music and Drama under Bryan Drake; he later privately studied under Otakar Kraus. Moses has sung with all the major British opera companies, including The Royal Opera, the Welsh National Opera, as well as performing at the Glyndebourne Festival Opera.

References

External links

1952 births
Living people
People from Abercynon
Sportspeople from Rhondda Cynon Taf
People educated at Ysgol Gyfun Ystalyfera
Alumni of Emmanuel College, Cambridge
Welsh cricketers
Cambridge University cricketers
Welsh schoolteachers
Alumni of the Guildhall School of Music and Drama
Welsh operatic baritones
20th-century Welsh male opera singers
21st-century Welsh male opera singers